River Falls High School is a public high school in River Falls, Wisconsin.

Extracurricular activities

Marching band
The RFHS marching band has won its class in marching band competition 21 times since 1985.  It won the AAA division state titles in 2005, 2007, 2008, 2009, 2010, 2011, 2012, 2013, 2016.

Athletics
RFHS offers boys' baseball, girls' softball, boys' and girls' basketball, boys' and girls' cross country, boys' football, boys' and girls' golf, girls' gymnastics, boys' and girls' hockey, boys' and girls' soccer, boys' and girls' swimming and diving, boys' and girls' tennis, boys' and girls' track and field, girls' volleyball, and boys' wrestling (https://www.riverfallswrestling.org/).

Since 1989, RFHS has competed in the Big River Conference. Before 1989, it competed in the Middle Border Conference, being an inaugural member of that conference in 1932.

The school's co-op St. Croix Fusion girls' hockey team won state championships in 2009, 2010, and 2011. The girls' gymnastics team has made 22 state appearances, with 6 state championships.

RFHS has hosted numerous outstanding wrestling athletes and teams, with 18 individual state titles and 67 state placement medals from over 120 state qualifiers, and qualified for the WIAA Team State Tournament 5 times. Ten RFHS wrestlers have had undefeated seasons and one an undefeated career.

Notable alumni
 Kevin Black (Class of 1998) – Wrestling coach
 Annie Frisbie - long distance runner
 Warren P. Knowles – Governor of Wisconsin
 Frankie Rayder – International fashion model
 Missy Rayder (Class of 1994)  – International fashion model
 George B. Skogmo – Wisconsin State Senator
 Francis Paul Prucha – Historian
 Karyn Bye-Dietz - Olympic Gold Medalist (women’s hockey)
 J. P. Feyereisen - Major League Baseball relief pitcher

Wildcat Hall of Fame
In 2011 a RFHS Hall of Fame was created for athletes, coaches, teams, distinguished citizens, and legacy members.

References

External links 
River Falls High School
River Falls HS Athletics
Wildcat Hall of Fame
River Falls High School architecture

Public high schools in Wisconsin
Schools in Pierce County, Wisconsin
River Falls, Wisconsin
Educational institutions established in 1887
1887 establishments in Wisconsin